Saudi Arabia competed at the 1988 Summer Olympics in Seoul, South Korea.

Competitors
The following is the list of number of competitors in the Games.

Results by event

Archery
In the second time the nation competed in archery at the Olympics, Saudi Arabia entered two men.  Once again, the Saudis only narrowly avoided constituting the bottom of the ranking.  They placed 82nd and 83rd out of 84 archers.

Men

Athletics
Men's 3.000m Steeplechase
 Mohammed al-Dosari
 Heat — 8:45.25
 Semi Final — 8:44.22 (→ did not advance)

Men's Javelin Throw 
 Abdul Azeem Al-Alawyat
 Qualification — 56.32m (→ did not advance)

References

Official Olympic Reports

Nations at the 1988 Summer Olympics
1988
1988 in Saudi Arabian sport